

Events
 Sólarljóð (The Song of the Sun) an Old Norse poem, written in Iceland

Births
 Jehan Erart born 1200 or 1210 (died 1259), trouvère
 Ulrich von Liechtenstein (died 1278), German medieval nobleman, knight, politician, and Minnesänger
 possible
 Jayadeva (died unknown), Sanskrit poet known for the epic Gita Govinda

Deaths

 Chand Bardai (born 1149), Hindu Brahmin and the court poet of the Indian king Prithviraj Chauhan
 Zhu Xi (born 1130), Confucian scholar, philosopher and writer

13th-century poetry
Poetry

References